Autophagy-related protein 9A is a protein that in humans is encoded by the ATG9A gene.

Functional studies indicate that ATG9A plays a role in autophagy. and other non-autophagy membrane remodeling processes such as plasma membrane repair. Enzymatically, it is a lipid scramblase. ATG9A interacts with IQGAP1 and the ESCRT machinery in membrane remodeling.

References

Further reading

External links